James Bernard Frost is an American author.  His novels A Very Minor Prophet and World Leader Pretend explore American subcultures.  His travel guide for vegetarians, The Artichoke Trail, won a Lowell Thomas Award for travel journalism.  He regularly publishes essays on the online magazine The Nervous Breakdown.

Bibliography
 The Artichoke Trail (Hunter Publishing, 2000)
 2001 Lowell Thomas Award
 World Leader Pretend (St. Martin's Press, 2007)
 A Very Minor Prophet (Hawthorne Books, 2012)

References

American travel writers
American male non-fiction writers
Living people
Year of birth missing (living people)